"Sleeping Beauty" is a song by Australian rock band Divinyls. It was released in December 1985 from their second studio album What a Life!. The song proved to be a minor success in Australia when it peaked at number fifty.

Background

"Sleeping Beauty" was written by Mark McEntee and lead singer Christina Amphlett. The song was produced by Mike Chapman, who also went on to produce the final recording stages of What a Life! and Divinyls next album Temperamental.

Earlier in 1985, Divinyls had garnered great success with the single "Pleasure and Pain", which went to the top twenty in Australia and also charted on the U.S. Billboard Hot 100 singles chart. "Sleeping Beauty" did not meet with the same success as its predecessor, however it did just make the top fifty in Australia, peaking at number fifty.

Track listing
Australian 7" Single
 "Sleeping Beauty" - 3:38
 "Motion" - 3:36

Australian & German 12" Single
 "Sleeping Beauty" (Extended Mix) - 5:01
 "Motion" - 3:36
 "Sleeping Beauty" (Instrumental) - 3:36

Charts

References

1985 singles
Divinyls songs
Song recordings produced by Mike Chapman
Songs written by Chrissy Amphlett
Songs written by Mark McEntee
1985 songs
Chrysalis Records singles